The archaeological site of Antongona is located in the Itasy Region of Madagascar (formerly Imamo), roughly 36 km west of Antananarivo and 6 km north of Imerintsiatosika, Itasy.

Site Description 

Antongona is a sacred hill, it consists of two royal houses dated from the 16th and 18th Centuries AD, spaced roughly 300 m apart and a royal tomb.  Situated on natural rock formations, stone walls and doorways augmented the inherent defensive qualities of the rock formations constructed upon.  From the center of the structure, a full 360° view was obtained of the surrounding landscape, further exemplifying the defensive quality of the sites.

There is also a small museum that is open from 14h to 16h.

World Heritage Status 
This site was added to the Tentative List of UNESCO World Heritage Sites in Madagascar on November 14, 1997, in the Cultural category.

Notes

References 
 Antongona - UNESCO World Heritage Centre Retrieved 2009-03-02.

Archaeological sites in Madagascar
Archaeological sites of Eastern Africa
Itasy Region